Bellei is an Italian surname. Notable people with the surname include:

Aldo Mario Bellei, Italian-American defendant in Rogers v. Bellei
Gaetano Bellei (1857–1922), Italian painter
Giacomo Bellei (born 1988), Italian volleyball player
Mino Bellei (1936–2022), Italian actor

Italian-language surnames